This page describes the qualifying procedure for the 1982 UEFA European Under-16 Football Championship. 26 teams were divided into 8 groups of two, three and four teams each. The eight winners advanced to the quarterfinals, consisting in two-legged rounds. The four winners of the quarterfinals advanced to the final tournament.

Qualifying stage

Group I

Group II

Group III

Group IV

Group V

Group VI

Group VII

Group VIII

Quarter-finals

First leg

Second leg

Finland won 3–2 on aggregate.

West Germany won 4–3 on aggregate.

Italy won 5–2 on aggregate.

Yugoslavia 2–2 Soviet Union on aggregate. Yugoslavia won 4–3 on penalties.

References
UEFA.com
RSSSF.com

Qualifying
Qual
UEFA European Under-17 Championship qualification